The Chumbe Marine Park, officially recognized officially as Chumbe Reef Sanctuary since 1994, is  a privately managed marine park in Chumbe Island, Zanzibar. It is successful as an ecotourism project. The objective of this sanctuary is to preserve and develop the rich biodiversity of the coral. Set up after controversial debate over a period of 3 years between the private developer of the park, the government and the local fishermen, the sanctuary has received funds from European Union, Gesellschaft für Technische Zusammenarbeit (the German aid agency) and many other donors including the initial developer. The sanctuary offers a terrestrial Nature Trail and an “Eco-lodge” for accommodation as well as an education centre. In particular, among the many awards it has received, the important ones are the “UNEP Global 500 Award  for Environmental Achievement” and the British Airways Tourism for Tomorrow Southern Regional and Global Awards.

It is one of the most beautiful and diverse shallow reefs in the region. It is home to 90% of hard coral in East Africa with over 400 fish species, and is also an important feeding ground for green turtles and hawksbill. The Coral Reef Sanctuary is vital for biodiversity conservation as well as for fisheries in the region.

References

Protected areas of Zanzibar
Protected areas established in 1994
1994 establishments in Tanzania